The Holy Resurrection Orthodox Church is a historic Eastern Orthodox Church building on Petrograd Street in Berlin, New Hampshire. The church is known locally as "The Russian Church" because it was built in 1915 by immigrants from the Russian Empire who were mostly from the provinces of Grodno, Volyn, and Minsk in modern-day Belarus and Ukraine. The church closed in 1963 but reopened in 1974 for the funeral of a Russian immigrant from modern-day Belarus, named Eugenia (Tarasevich) Tupick. It was added to the National Register of Historic Places in 1979 and is part of the Orthodox Church in America (OCA).

Architecture 

The Holy Resurrection Orthodox Church was designed by John Bergesen, an architect from New York City. The church was built with six onion domes, which was common in Russian architecture of that period. The inside of the church is divided into three parts: the vestibule, the nave, and the sanctuary. Its icons were some of the last ones to leave Russia before Czar Nicholas II was overthrown.

History 

In 1915, Reverend Arcady Piotrowsky came to Berlin from Cleveland, Ohio to establish an Orthodox church for the approximately 500 Russians that inhabited Berlin at that time. At first the church services were held in another church, but then moved to an old garage owned by the city. A site at the base of Mt. Forest was chosen for a new church building to be built, and on May 1, 1915, construction of the church began. On October 1, of that same year, the church was complete.

Reliquaries 
Holy Resurrection Orthodox Church houses two reliquary icons, one of Saint Herman of Alaska and one of Saint Nicholas the Wonderworker. The relic of Saint Herman of Alaska was given to the church by Metropolitan Theodosius during a parish visit. In the icon of Saint Nicholas, the saint is pictured holding the city of Berlin in his hand. The relic of Saint Nicholas was found in the altar in late summer of 2003, originally transferred from Saint Nicholas Orthodox Church in Richmond, Maine, and placed into the icon by Bishop Nikon December 6, 2003.

See also 
 History of the Eastern Orthodox Church in North America
 National Register of Historic Places listings in Coos County, New Hampshire
 Orthodox Church in America

References

Images of America, Berlin by Renney E. Morneau, page 67
Postcard History Series, Berlin, published by Arcadia Publishing in 2008 and written by Jacklyn T. Nadeau, page 87

External links
 Holy Resurrection Orthodox Church official website
 Holy Resurrection Orthodox Church on Berlin New Hampshire History
 Holy Resurrection Orthodox Church's page on the Orthodox Church in America (OCA) website
 

Churches on the National Register of Historic Places in New Hampshire
Churches completed in 1915
20th-century Eastern Orthodox church buildings
Churches in Coös County, New Hampshire
National Register of Historic Places in Coös County, New Hampshire
Churches in Berlin, New Hampshire